The women's 4 × 100 metres relay competition of the athletics events at the 2019 Pan American Games took place on  9 of August at the 2019 Pan American Games Athletics Stadium. The defending Pan American Games champion is United States.

Summary
USA tried to use the advantage of USC teammates Chanel Brissett and Twanisha Terry on their first two legs.  It didn't work because the two teammates didn't hand off at USC, USA found themselves in dead last at the first exchange.  The lost their stagger advantage to Brazil on their inside, while on the far outside, Trinidad and Tobago and Canada with returning 2015 bronze medalists Khamica Bingham and Crystal Emmanuel were out ahead.  Ecuador took too long to pass at the first exchange and were disqualified.  Terry did gain some ground back from Brazil's Vitória Cristina Rosa on her leg.  Brazil was first to make the second pass, with Trinidad arriving ahead of Canada but making a slow handoff from veteran Michelle-Lee Ahye to Mauricia Prieto.  Peru and Bahamas disappeared at the second handoff.  Shania Collins burned the turn for USA, catching up to within a step of Lorraine Martins for Brazil by the third handoff, ahead of Trinidad and Canada.  It was a looking like battle as Lynna Irby would try to pull in Brazilian veteran Rosângela Santos but Irby's 400 speed was no match for Santos.  Instead Canada's Leya Buchanan ran past Trinidad's veteran Kelly-Ann Baptiste and nipped Irby at the line for silver.

Records
Prior to this competition, the existing world and Pan American Games records were as follows:

Schedule

Results
All times shown are in seconds.

Final
The results were as follows

References

Athletics at the 2019 Pan American Games
2019